The Governor Irwin was a fireboat operated in San Francisco, California from 1878 to 1909.  She was steam powered.  She participated in the recovery after the 1906 San Francisco earthquake and fire. She was owned by the State of California, she could only pump a modest 1000 gallons per minute.

The Governor Markham, commissioned in 1895, was a twin of the Governor Irwin.

References

Fireboats of California